The .500 Black Powder Express was a series of Black powder cases of varying lengths that emerged in the 1860s.

Development
The cartridge was offered in several case lengths including 1-inch, 2-inch, 2-inch, 2-inch,  3-inch and 3-inch,several were successful and endured others lasted only a short period.

The 3-inch and 3-inch .500 BPE cartridges have survived to the current day as the .500 3-inch Nitro for Black and the .500 3-inch Nitro for Black, the same cartridges loaded with mild loadings of modern smokeless powder, carefully balanced through trial to replicate the ballistics of the Black powder version.  The two cartridges offer almost identical ballistic performance to each other, and are very similar to the .50-140 Sharps.

Nitro Express loadings
The 3-inch and 3-inch cartridges were later loaded with smokeless cordite to create the .500 Nitro Express, with the 3-inch version becoming the most popular.

Parent case
In the 1870s the 3-inch cartridge was necked down to .45-inches to create the .500/450 Magnum Black Powder Express which in turn, when loaded with cordite, became the .500/450 Nitro Express. After the British government's 1907 ban of .450 caliber ammunition to India and Sudan, the .500/465 Nitro Express and the .470 Nitro Express were formed from this cartridge.

Dimensions

Use
The .500 BPE was considered a good cartridge for medium-sized non dangerous game and can still be used for such.

The .500 BPE was never highly regarded for hunting in Africa, yet it was a popular cartridge in India, considered a good general purpose rifle cartridge popular for hunting tigers.  Jim Corbett was a user of a .500 BPE rifle prior to switching to a .400 Jeffery Nitro Express double rifle, shooting cordite Nitro for Black loadings this rifle was used to dispatch the first man-eater he shot, the Champawat Tiger.

See also
 Express (weaponry)
 List of rifle cartridges
 13 mm caliber

References

Footnotes

Bibliography
 Barnes, Frank C. & Amber, John T., Cartridges of the World, DBI Books, Northfield, 1972, .
 Corbett, Jim, Man-Eaters of Kumaon, Oxford University Press, Bombay, 1944.
 [https://web.archive.org/web/20150527033406/http://www.kynochammunition.co.uk/cartridge%20collection.html Kynoch Ammunition, Big Game Cartridges kynochammunition.co.uk]
 McCarthy, Daniel, Mini Compendium of Big Bore Cartridges, 2004, archived 26 March 2009.
 Wieland, Terry, Dangerous-game rifles'', ed 2, Down East Books / Shooting Sportsman Press, 2009, .
 Wieland, Terry, Nitro Express: The Big Bang of the Big Bang, retrieved 14 Nov 15.

External links

 .500 Black Powder Express 3"
 , vídeo 

Pistol and rifle cartridges
British firearm cartridges